Epsilon Crucis, ε Crucis (abbreviated Eps Cru, ε Cru), also known as Ginan , is a single, orange-hued star in the southern constellation of Crux. Measurements made by the Hipparcos spacecraft showed an annual parallax shift of 14.19 mas, which provides a distance estimate of about 230 light years. The star can be seen with the naked eye, having an apparent visual magnitude of 3.58. It is moving closer to the Sun with a radial velocity of −4.60 km.s−1.

This is a giant star of type K with a stellar classification of K3III, indicating that it has exhausted the hydrogen at its core and evolved away from the main sequence. It is about two billion years old with 1.5 times the mass of the Sun and has expanded to 28 times the Sun's radius. The star is shining with around 302 times the Sun's luminosity from its enlarged photosphere at an effective temperature of 4,294 K.

Nomenclature 
ε Crucis (Latinised to Epsilon Crucis) is the star's Bayer designation.

The system bore the traditional name Ginan in the culture of the Wardaman people of the Northern Territory of Australia, refers to a dilly bag - the "Bag of Songs." In 2016, the IAU organized a Working Group on Star Names (WGSN) to catalog and standardize proper names for stars. The WGSN approved the name Ginan for Epsilon Crucis on 19 November 2017 and it is now so included in the List of IAU-approved Star Names.

It was also sometimes called Intrometida (intrusive) in Portuguese.

In culture 
Ginan is represented on the national flags of Australia, Papua New Guinea and Samoa. It is also featured in the flag of Brazil, along with 26 other stars, each of which represents a state. It represents the State of Espírito Santo.

References 

Crucis, Epsilon
Crux (constellation)
Ginan
K-type giants
060260
107446
4700
Durchmusterung objects
Suspected variables